Veronica Vasquez (born 18 October 1995) is an Argentine doctor working as an anesthesiologist, and the captain of the Argentina women's national cricket team. During the COVID-19 pandemic in Argentina, Vasquez was working in the Fiorito Hospital in Buenos Aires.

Vasquez made her Women's Twenty20 International (WT20I) debut on 3 October 2019, for Argentina against Peru in the 2019 South American Cricket Championship. Vasquez captained Argentina in all five matches they played in the tournament. In October 2021, Vasquez was named as the captain of Argentina's side for the 2021 ICC Women's T20 World Cup Americas Qualifier tournament in Mexico.

References

External links

1995 births
Living people
Argentine women cricketers
Argentina women Twenty20 International cricketers
Women cricket captains
Place of birth missing (living people)